Vardan Bostanjyan (born 9 September 1949) is an Armenian politician. He attended at Yerevan State University. Tumanyan served as a Prosperous Armenia member of the National Assembly of Armenia from 1999 to 2003. He also served as ambassador of the National Assembly of Armenia from 12 May 2007.

References 

1949 births
Living people
Politicians from Yerevan
Prosperous Armenia politicians
20th-century Armenian politicians
21st-century Armenian politicians
Yerevan State University alumni
Members of the National Assembly (Armenia)